Emanuel Fortune (3 January 1833 – 27 January 1897) was an American shoemaker, farmer, and political leader who represented Jackson County, Florida at the 1868 Florida Constitutional Convention and in the Florida House of Representatives before being forced to flee and re-establishing himself in Duval County, Florida, where he held several offices. He served in the Florida House of Representatives from 1868 to 1870.  

Fortune was born into slavery in 1833 on the Russ Plantation near Marianna, Florida. Fortune worked as a shoemaker before entering politics. Fortune was an African Methodist Episcopal Church layman and was appointed to the county board of voter registration. In the 1850s, Fortune married Sarah Jane Miers. The couple's son, Timothy Thomas Fortune, became a noted radical newspaper editor and activist for African American rights.

Fortune was elected to the 1868 Florida Constitutional Convention as one of four representatives for Jackson County. Fortune was forced to leave Jackson County due to lawlessness and served the remainder of his elected term in Jacksonville.

In November 1871, Jackson testified at the United States Senate Select Committee on Outrages in Southern States, a special session of the 42nd United States Congress that investigated Ku Klux Klan violence in North Carolina and Florida. Jackson was questioned by the chairman of the committee, Henry Wilson, and Thomas F. Bayard. Fortune testified about the difficulty Black farmers had in obtaining small parcels of land and the racially motivated attacks and violence that he had witnessed.

Fortune is buried at the Old Jacksonville City Cemetery in Duval County, Florida.

A photograph of Fortune appears in Canter Brown Jr.'s book, Florida's Black Public Officials, 1867-1924.

References

External links
 A photograph of Fortune at the Florida State Archives

1833 births
1897 deaths
African-American politicians during the Reconstruction Era
American freedmen
African-American state legislators in Florida
People from Marianna, Florida
People of the African Methodist Episcopal church
Florida Republicans
19th-century American politicians